Lord Goring may refer to:

George Goring, 1st Earl of Norwich (1585–1663), prominent Royalist in the English Civil War
George Goring, Lord Goring (1608–1657), eldest son of the above
Charles Goring, 2nd Earl of Norwich (1615–1671), second son of the first Earl of Norwich
Sir Harry Goring, 4th Baronet, third cousin twice removed of the last Goring Earl of Norwich, created Viscount Goring and Baron Bullinghel in the Jacobite Peerage

Fictional characters
Arthur, Viscount Goring, a fictional character in Oscar Wilde's 1895 play An Ideal Husband
George Goring, Lord Goring, fictional character in Anthony Powell's 1952 novel A Buyer's Market, second in the A Dance to the Music of Time cycle